Luqiao District (Tai-chow dialect: Lu-giao K'ü) is a district of Taizhou in Zhejiang Province, People's Republic of China.

Luqiao District was established in 1994, having previously been a town under the administration of Huangyan County (present-day Huangyan District). Luqiao is the location of Taizhou Luqiao Airport and also is the headquarters of Taizhou Commercial Bank and Zhejiang Tailong Commercial Bank, making it the financial capital of Taizhou. Geely Car group originated from Luqiao and has a large manufacturing base here.

Administrative divisions
Luqiao District is divided into 6 subdistricts and 4 towns:
Lunan Subdistrict
Luqiao Subdistrict
Lubei Subdistrict
Luoyang Subdistrict
Tongyu Subdistrict
Fengjiang Subdistrict
Xinqiao
Hengjie
Jinqing
Pengjie

References

External links
  official site main page
 official site (English)

Districts of Zhejiang
Taizhou, Zhejiang